Perillula is a genus of flowering plant in the family Lamiaceae, first described in 1875. It contains only one known species, Perillula reptans, endemic to Japan (including the Ryukyu Islands).

References

Lamiaceae
Endemic flora of Japan
Monotypic Lamiaceae genera